Hasvik is a village in Hasvik Municipality in Troms og Finnmark county, Norway. The village is located on the southwestern tip of the large island of Sørøya.

In 1809, Hasvik was looted by British naval forces. HMS Snake arrived on July 4 with a crew of around 100 men. The ship stayed until July 9 and the crew stole all valuables they could find.

The main church for the municipality, Hasvik Church, has been located here since the early 1700s. It was burnt by retreating German forces in 1944, and rebuilt in 1955.

This village has Sørøya's only connections to the rest of Norway: Hasvik Airport and a car ferry to Øksfjord on the mainland.

References

Villages in Finnmark
Hasvik
Populated places of Arctic Norway